Haraipur is a village situated in the Siwan district of Bihar, India. It is in the eastern part of the district, and surrounded by villages Balathara, Sohilpatty, Usuri, Seriyan, Parauli and Balitola. Gandak canal passes through the village.
Pin Code is 841406.

External links 
 http://www.haraipur.com

Villages in Siwan district